Braton Hollow is a valley in the U.S. state of Oregon.

Braton Hollow was named in 1885 after one Darlin Brayton.

References

Landforms of Jackson County, Oregon
Valleys of Oregon